"Record Year" is a song co-written and recorded by American country music artist Eric Church.  It was released in February 2016 as the second single from his 2015 album Mr. Misunderstood. Church wrote this song with Jeff Hyde.  The song peaked at number 44 on the Billboard Hot 100 and number one on the Country Airplay chart.

Content
The song is about a man who recovers from a broken heart by listening to a collection of vinyl record albums. Its lyrics include references to various musical artists to whom the narrator is listening.

Critical reception
Billy Dukes of Taste of Country reviewed the single favorably, praising the songwriting and saying that "Eric Church has never sung heartbreak the same way twice — a streak that remains intact with Record Year. The second single from his Mr. Misunderstood album finds him hurting in a whole new way."

Commercial performance

"Record Year" reached No. 1 on the Country Airplay chart, which is Church's seventh No. 1 on the chart. It also peaked at No. 2 on the Hot Country Songs chart.  The song has sold 447,000 copies in the US as of November 2016.  It was certified double Platinum by the RIAA on April 29, 2019 for two million units in sales and streams.

Music video
The music video was directed by Reid Long and John Peets and premiered in April 2016.

Charts and certifications

Weekly charts

Year end charts

Certifications

References

2015 songs
2016 singles
Eric Church songs
EMI Records singles
Song recordings produced by Jay Joyce
Songs written by Eric Church
Songs written by Jeff Hyde
Songs about heartache
Songs about loneliness
Songs about music